Burriss is a surname. Notable people with the surname include:

Emmanuel Burriss (born 1985), American baseball player
Milford Burriss (1937–2016), American businessman and politician
Moffatt Burriss (1919–2019), American businessman and politician

See also
Burress
Burris